Lillico is a rural locality in the local government area (LGA) of Devonport in the North-west and west LGA region of Tasmania. The 2016 census recorded a population of 25 for the state suburb of Lillico.

History 
Lillico was gazetted as a locality in 1962. It is believed to be named for Alexander Lillico, a Tasmanian politician who represented the area from 1924 to 1954.

Geography
The waters of Bass Strait form the northern boundary. The Western Railway Line passes through from east to north-west.

Road infrastructure 
National Route 1 (Bass Highway) runs through from east to north-west.

References

Towns in Tasmania
Devonport, Tasmania